The Northeastern Athletic Conference  is a high school conference in northeast and north central Illinois. The conference participates in athletics and activities in the Illinois High School Association. The conference comprises 3 small public high schools and 9 small private school, with enrollments between 19 and 850 students in Cook, DeKalb, Kane, Kendall, LaSalle, McHenry, and Winnebago counties.

History 
Established in 2009 with nine teams from various conferences including five teams from the Indian Trails Conference, which is a member of the Wisconsin Interscholastic Athletic Association, the Northeastern Athletic Conference included teams from the communities of Arlington Heights, Aurora, Chicago, Elgin, Hebron, Kirkland, Mooseheart, and Rockford. After the conclusion of the 2011–12 school year, Rockford Christian left the conference and Elgin's Harvest Christian Academy joined the league. The conference expanded to 10 teams prior to the 2013–14 school year as Crystal Lake's Faith Lutheran High School joined. The conference expanded yet again in 2015 with the addition of Aurora Christian High School, taking the total to 11 teams. The following season the conference expanded to its largest total by adding two teams; Schaumburg Christian High School from Schaumburg, and South Beloit High School from South Beloit making a total of 13 teams. In 2017 the league would shrink back to 12 as Chicago's Luther North High School would close its doors after 108 years of educating students. The league would change again in 2018 after Aurora Christian would leave to join the Metro Suburban Conference, however, Parkview Christian Academy from Yorkville would take their place, keeping the league at 12. In 2019, Faith Lutheran High School would begin a coop with existing conference school Alden-Hebron High School. This coop would allow Our Lady of the Sacred Heart Academy to join, again keeping the league with 12 members.

Current membership 

Sources:IHSA Conferences, IHSA Coop Teams, and IHSA Member Schools Directory

Football only members

Previous members

Previous football only members

Membership timeline

References

External links
 NEAC
 Alden-Hebron High School
 Christian Liberty Academy
 Christian Life High School
 Harvest Christian Academy
 Kirkland-Hiawatha High School
 Illinois Math and Science Academy
 Keith Country Day School
 Mooseheart High School
 Ottawa Marquette Academy
 Our Lady of the Sacred Heart Academy
 Parkview Christian Academy
 Rockford Christian High School
 Schaumburg Christian High School
 South Beloit High School
 Walther Christian Academy
 Westminster Christian School
 NEAC Constitution

High school sports conferences and leagues in the United States
Illinois high school sports conferences
High school sports in Illinois
2009 establishments in Illinois